Grassroots is a 2012 American political dark comedy film directed by Stephen Gyllenhaal, based on the book Zioncheck for President by Phil Campbell.

Shot in Seattle, the film revolves around a grassroots campaign for Seattle City Council and explores what happens when a dedicated activist tries to realize a vision by seeking political office.

Plot
The film tells the story of Phil Campbell (Jason Biggs), a journalist who has just lost his job and gets roped into leading  Grant Cogswell's political campaign. Grant, played by Joel David Moore, is Phil's enthusiastic and eccentric friend whose passion for the Seattle Monorail Project inspires him to run for Seattle City Council. Grant is running against Richard McIver, played by Cedric the Entertainer, although McIver has more money and more supporters, Grant's blind passion paired with Phil's strategy makes Grant a contender.

Cast 
 Jason Biggs as Phil Campbell
 Joel David Moore as Grant Cogswell 
 Lauren Ambrose as Emily Bowen
 Cobie Smulders as Clair 
 Tom Arnold as Tommy
 Emily Bergl as Theresa Glendon
 Todd Stashwick as Nick Ricochet
 Cedric the Entertainer as Richard McIver
 DC Pierson as Wayne
 Christopher McDonald as Jim Tripp

References

External links
 
 

2012 films
Films about elections
Films directed by Stephen Gyllenhaal
2010s English-language films
American political comedy films
American black comedy films
Films shot in Washington (state)
Films shot in Seattle
2010s American films